Invasion is the twenty-ninth album by the Norwegian electronic dance music producer Aleksander Vinter, and his eleventh using the alias "Savant". The album was released song by song on SoundCloud, with the exception of "Broken". It was remastered and re-released in January 2015 as a pay what you want album on Bandcamp, and the remastered versions have since been released on all popular online music stores.

Album description
"Invasion is similar to other albums I’ve done straight after a big concept album. Like Overkill, which I released for free last year. Invasion is a freedom album with the emphasis on fun. It’s about the tracks, not the journey. I wanted to get back to that Vario vibe; fun and silly and computer gamey. It’s a bit more commercial sounding than other stuff, but it’s my take on commercial sounding music. I’ve had a lot of fun making it, and when I play any of the tracks live people go awesome!" — Savant

Track listing
Orphan – 5:29
Upgrade – 5:55
Invasion – 5:20
Pizza Power Alien – 4:04
Trap Slut – 5:05
Change – 4:11
Pixel Bee – 6:19
Innocence – 4:04
Basement – 5:20
Colorblind – 5:44
Return – 4:20
1997 – 8:52
Broken – 6:32
Desperado – 5:34
Problematimaticalculatorture – 3:47
Massacre – 5:00
Killer – 5:39
Dreamscape – 9:00

References

Savant (musician) albums
2015 albums